Because It Is Bitter, and Because It Is My Heart is a 1990 novel by American novelist Joyce Carol Oates.  The title is taken from "In the Desert", a poem by Stephen Crane.  Oates's novel was nominated for best work of fiction in the 1990 National Book Awards.

Plot summary
In the early 1950s in Hammond, New York, a young white girl named Iris Courtney and her black friend Jinx Fairchild are united by a murder that they commit in self-defense. From this central moment, this novel weaves out the stories of two families that intercross across divisions of race and class.

Critical reaction
Entertainment Weekly gave it an A, calling Oates "a storyteller with few peers".

References

External links
 http://jco.usfca.edu/works/novels/bitter.html
 Book Review, The New York Times

Novels by Joyce Carol Oates
1990 American novels
Fiction set in the 1950s
Novels set in New York (state)
Dutton Penguin books
St. Lawrence County, New York